Pemalang Regency is a regency on the north coast of Central Java province in Indonesia. Its capital is the town of Pemalang. The regency is bordered by the Java Sea in the north, in the east by Pekalongan Regency, by Purbalingga Regency in the south, and by Tegal Regency in the west. It covers an area of 1,115.30 km2, and it had a population of 1,261,353 at the 2010 Census and 1,471,489 at the 2020 Census.

History

Pre Mataram

Archaeological evidence demonstrates settlement in Pemalang during prehistoric times. The findings of the punden and baths in the north-west of the District Moga. Ganesha statue, phallus, graves and tombstones in the village Keropak. Besides archaeological evidence that suggests the existence of an Islamic cultural elements can also be connected such as the grave of Sheikh Maulana Maghribi in Comal Kawedanan. There is also the grave of Rohidin, Sayyid uncle of Sunan Ampel Ngali who had a mission to convert the local population.

Pemalang's existence in the 16th century can be attributed to van Goens Rijkloff records and data in the book of W. Fruin Mees stated that in 1575 Pemalang is one of 14 independent regions in Java, led by a prince or a king. In a later development, and Panembahan Seda Senopati Panembahan Krapyak of Mataram conquered these areas, including Pemalang. Since then, Pemalang has become vassals of the Mataram area ruled by princes or vassal kings.

Pemalang and Kendal in the period before the 17th century was an area that was more important than Tegal, Pekalongan and Semarang, because of the highway linking the northern coast to the hinterland of Central Java (Mataram) that crosses Pemalang and Wiradesa, regarded as the oldest road connecting the two regions.

As the population of rural settlements that have regularly appeared in the early centuries AD to the period of the 14th and 15th centuries, and then growing rapidly in the 16th century, which increased during the development of Islam in Java under a kingdom of Demak, Cirebon and then Mataram.

At that time Pemalang have successfully established traditional governance in the years around 1575. Figure origins of Pajang named Prince Benawa. The Prince is King Jipang origin who succeeded his father who had died, Sultan Adiwijaya.

The position of the king was preceded by a bitter feud between him and Aria Pangiri.

Prince Benawa only ruled for one year. He died – -local belief states that Prince Benawa died in Pemalang, and was buried in the village Penggarit (now the Heroes Cemetery Penggarit).

Duchy subordinate Mataram

Pemalang into administrative territorial unit steady since R. Mangoneng, Pangonen or Mangunoneng became ruler Pemalang region centered on Hamlet Oneng, Bojongbata village in about 1622. During this period Pemalang is apanage of Prince Purbaya of Mataram. According to some sources Mangoneng R is a figure that local leaders supporting the policy of Sultan Agung. A character who is very anti- VOC. Thus Mangoneng can be seen as a leader, soldier, warrior and hero of the nation in the fight against the Dutch colonization in the 17th century is the struggle against the Dutch under the banner of Sultan Agung of Mataram.

In about 1652, Sunan Ingabehi Subajaya Amangkurat II lifted into the Regent Pemalang after Amangkurat II established rule in Mataram throne after uprising Trunajaya extinguished with the help of the VOC in 1678.

Diponegoro War

According to the Dutch in 1820 Pemalang then ruled by a regent named Mas Tumenggung Suralaya. At this time Pemalang has been closely associated with the character Kanjeng Swargi or Kanjeng Pontang. A regent involved in the war Diponegoro. Swargi Kanjeng is also known as Gusti Sepuh, and during the war he managed to flee to the Netherlands Sigeseng or Kendaldoyong. Tomb of Gusti Sepuh can be identified as the tomb of Kanjeng Swargi or Reksodiningrat. In times of year reign between 1823 and 1825 i.e. during Reksadiningrat Regents. Note Netherlands said that the persistent assist the Dutch in the Diponegoro war in the North Coast area of Java just – regent regent Tegal, Kendal and rods without mentioning Regent Pemalang.

Meanwhile, in another part of the book P.J.F. Louw, entitled De Java Oorlog van 1825 -1830 reported that Van den Resident Poet organize some good lineup of Tegal, Pemalang and Bradford to defend themselves from Diponegoro in September 1825 until the end of January 1826. Involvement in helping the Dutch Pemalang this can be attributed with the Dutch statement stating Duke Reksodiningrat only officially recorded as regent until 1825 Pemalang. deployment and probable events that occur after the Pemalang Reksodiningrat Duke joins forces which resulted in the Dutch Diponegoro stop Regent Reksodiningrat.

In 1832 the Regent Pemalang Mbahurekso is Raden Tumenggung Sumo Negoro. At that time due to the success of abundant prosperity of agriculture in the area Pemalang. As is known Pemalang is the producer of rice, coffee, tobacco and peanuts. In a report published at the beginning of the 20th century, stated that Pemalang a Karisidenan department and the District of Pekalongan. Pemalang section divided into two Pemalang and Randudongkal. And all district is divided into 5 districts. So thus Pemalang a district name, district and Onder Karisidenan District of Pekalongan, Central Java Province.

First of all district center located in the village of Oneng. Although there are no remnants of this district, but still found another clue. Instructions in the form of a hamlet named Oneng which can still be found today in the village of Bojongbata. While all district centers are both confirmed to be in Ketandan. The remains of the building can still be seen today is around Ketandan Clinic (Department of Health). The third district is the center of the current district (all district near Town Square Pemalang). The district is now also the rest of the buildings built by the Dutch colonial. Which subsequently went through several rehab and renovation of buildings up to forms joglo as typical building in Central Java.

Dutch colonial period and beyond

Thus all district has been established as an administrative entity after the Dutch colonial administration. In biokratif all district administration also continue to be addressed. From the colonial bureaucratic forms that smells feudalistic bureaucracy towards more in line with developments in the present.

Independence

New order

1966–1967

In 1966, after the 30 September Movement ended and the 11 March Order was passed, based on the Decree (SK) of the Governor of the Central Java Region Number 204 of 1965 dated 24 August 1965, all sub-districts in all districts and municipalities in Central Java as many as 347 units, including Pemalang Regency as many as 9 sub-districts (Indonesian: kecamatan), as an amalgamation of the existing royal districts. So at that time in Pemalang Regency 9 (nine) districts had been formed, as a combination of the 18 existing sultanate districts. In 1966 the Pemalang Level II Region with a population of 1,248,851 people (in 1965) and an area of 198,962 hectares or 1,992.15 km2 still covered 3 kawedanaan, 9 sub-districts, and 124 new style villages (as a combination of 355 traditional former sultanate villages). In the same year, the construction period in Pemalang Regency had started. The first construction in 1967 was carried out on the construction of bridges, village roads, schools, waterways, irrigation canals, and markets, as well as widening of village roads, repair / renovation of bridges, roads, markets, schools, train stations and irrigation networks. In 1967, Pemalang train station began to be renovated.

1981

In 1981, based on the Decree of the Minister of Home Affairs number 140-502 of 1980 dated 22 September 1980 through the Decree of the Governor of the First Level Region of Central Java number 133-514 of 1980 dated 8 December 1980 and the Regional Regulation of the Province of Central Java Number 9 In 1981 on 10 March 1981, in Pemalang District, a sub-district was formed, namely by changing the status of the village to a sub-district, as many as 14 (fourteen) villages, namely 6 (six) villages in Pemalang City sub-district, 4 (four) villages in the Taman sub-district, 2 (two) villages in Comal sub-district, 1 (one) village in Moga sub-district, and 1 (one) village in Petarukan sub-district are designated as kelurahan.

1984

In further developments, in addition to changing the status of the village to a sub-district/administrative village in 1984, based on the Decree of the Minister of Home Affairs number 138-210 of 1982 and Decree (SK) of the Governor of the First Level Region of Central Java number 150–216 in 1983, to be precise in Pemalang Regency 5 (five) sub-district representatives have been formed, namely representatives of the Comal sub-district (based in Lewokan), representatives of the Moga sub-district (which is based in Warungpring), representatives of the Petarukan sub-district (which is based in Langenharjo), representatives of the Belik sub-district (which is based in Kawangan / Kendalrejo), and representatives of the Randudongkal sub-district (based in Randusari).

Anniversary and Sesanti

As a top penghomatan Kabupten Pemalang the history of the formation of local governments have agreed to give the attribute Anniversary Pemalang. It is always to commemorate the birth history of all district also to provide the nuanced values of patriotism and the values of heroism as a mirror of the people of all district.

One alternative determination anniversary all district was at the time a statement of Prince Diponegoro to levy war against the Dutch Colonial, which is dated 20 July 1823. However, based on the discussion of experts set up by the team all district, the so Pemalang is dated 24 January 1575, or coincide with POND Thursday 1st of Shawwal 1496 Hijri Je 982. The decision was further stipulated in Local Regulation regency of all district No. 9 of 1996 on the anniversary of all district. In 1575 to form the Solar sengkala realized Lunguding Word Wangsiting Gusti having literal meaning: wisdom, speech / Sabdo, teachings, messages, Lord, to have a value of 5751. While 1496 Je realized by Candra sengkala Tawakal Ambuko Wahananing Manunggal that have meaning literally surrender, open, vehicle / container / tools for, unity / together with having the value 6941.

As for all district Sesanti is Pancasila Kaloka Panduning Nagari, with five basic literal meaning, famous / well-known, the guidelines / guidance, country / region to have a value of 5751.

Geography

The northern part of the regency is lowland, while the southern part is mountainous, with the peak of Mount Slamet (on the border with Tegal and Purbalingga), the highest mountain in Central Java. Kali Comal River is the largest, which empties into the Java Sea (Edge Pemalang).

The regency capital is located at the northwest tip of the regency, directly adjacent to the Tegal regency. Pemalang is on the coastal road between Semarang and Surabaya Jakarta. In addition there is a provincial road that connects Pemalang with Purbalingga. One of the famous tourist attractions is the beach Pemalang thistle.

The regency lies in Central Java province, located on the northern coast of Java. Geographically the district is located between 109° 17'30" – 109° 40'30" E and 6° 52'30" – 7° 20'11" S.

From Semarang (Central Java provincial capital), this district is approximately 135 km to the west, or if reached by land vehicles takes approximately 3–4 hours. The whole district has an area of 111,530 km ², with the following boundaries:

The north borders the Java Sea
Eastern border is with Pekalongan Regency
Southern border is with Purbalingga Regency
Bordering on the west side with Tegal regency

Thus the whole district has a strategic position, both in terms of trade and government.

The district has a varied topography. The northern part of the district is a coastal area with an altitude ranging from 1 to 5 metres above sea level. The central part is a fertile lowland with an altitude of 6 to 15 metres above sea level; and the southern highlands and mountains are lush with cool air with at an altitude of 16 to 925 metres above sea level. The district region is crossed by two major rivers – the Waluh River and the Comal River. Most of the region is a fertile watershed.

Climate
Pemalang has a tropical monsoon climate (Am) with moderate to little rainfall from June to October and heavy to very heavy rainfall from November to May.

Administrative districts
Pemalang Regency consists of fourteen districts (kecamatan), tabulated below with their areas and their populations at the 2010 Census and the 2020 Census. The districts are further divided into 222 villages (rural desa and urban kelurahan). The administrative centre of government is in the Pemalang District. In addition to Pemalang, other significant district towns are Comal, Petarukan, Ulujami, Randudongkal and Moga.

All districts are mostly Javanese-speaking. In the west and south, inhabitants speak the Javanese dialects of Tegal and Banyumasan, while in the east (Petarukan, Comal, Ulujami, Ampelgading and Bodeh) they speak in the Javanese dialect of Pekalongan. In this regency also have many tribes in Slamet mountain.

Government 
The following is List of Pemalang Regent from time to time.

Household industry

Sapu Glagah Majalangu (Sweep glagah of Majalangu)
Kerajinan Kulit Ular Comal (Leather snake in Comal)
Batik Lurik di Wanarejan (Lurik in Wanarejan)
Konveksi di Ulujami (Convection in Ulujami)
Bagregan Asli Kubang

Industry
Just to the south of Pemalang, there is one large sugar mill named Sumberharjo sugar mill. Although not a popular tourist destination, the mill have many historical significance which regularly attract railfans from Britain or Europe: it is the last place where we can see Du Croo & Brauns steam locomotives in working order, it is also the last sugarcane in Central Java who still operates its field lines (as in 2014 harvesting season), and one of only two sugar mills in Java who regularly deployed their steam locomotives into the field lines (the other being Olean sugar mill in Situbondo, East Java).

Special food

 Nasi Grombyang (Grombyang Rice)
One of Pemalang typical foods is Grombyang rice. The name of this food is quite unique. It is called Grombyang rice because the portion of the dressing is more than the rice and its side dishes so that when it is served in a small bowl it sounds grombyang-grombyang or wobbling like going to spill. When serving, the food consists of rice, slices of buffalo meat and soup which is served with buffalo satay in a small bowl.
 Lontong Dekem (Dekem rice cake)
Dekem rice cake concoction consisted of sliced rice cake, coconut milk yellow curry like, and sprinkled with coconut serundeng. [1] Lontong dekem usually served with satay.
 Sate Loso (Loso Satay)
Loso satay, signature dish from Pemalang, which is served with beef and spicy peanut sauce as its topping
 Sauto atau Soto Tauto (kind of soup)
Coto Tauto with fermented soybeans and buffalo meat
 Kue Kamir (Kamir Cake)
It is the traditional cake of Pemalang, Central Java. Kamir made of rice and wheat floor. The wheat Kamir made of mixed wheat floor, margarine, yeast, and sugar. However, the dough should be let overnight to have a perfect dough. While the rice Kamir is made of mixed rice floor, coconut milk, yeast, and sugar.
 Apem Comal, snacks (cake) is made from rice flour and brown sugar. This food is quite legendary in Pemalang – pekalongan border, this food is produced in the hamlet village of Bantul kesesi pekalongan but because of marketing since time immemorial spread to cities Comal then many who call the Comal apem.

Tourism

Is a famous tourist attraction Blendung Beach, Beach Water Park, thistle, and Cempaka Wulung upland Moga, waterfall bengkawah and cilating in belik, arugn jerang in tegalarja warungpring
Arts and culture are well known Baritan, Kuntulan and Sintren
Shopping on Pemalang Among other Pemalang Yogya department store, department store Bases, Sirandu Mall, Pemalang Permai Apartment, Plaza Pemalang (Matahari Department Store)

Famous people
Hendra Setiawan, Badminton gold medalist at the 2008 Beijing Olympics with Markis Kido.
Muammar Z.A., quran reciter and international hafiz.

References

Lucas, Anton (1977). Social revolution in Pemalang, Central Java, 1945. Indonesia 24:87–122.

External links
Government of the Regency of Pemalang – in Indonesian

Regencies of Central Java